Charmides, son of Glaucon,  was an Athenian statesman who flourished during the 5th century BC.  An uncle of Plato, Charmides appears in the Platonic dialogue bearing his name (Charmides), the Protagoras, and the Symposium, as well as in Xenophon's Symposium, Memorabilia, and Hellenica. In  the dialogue bearing his name he is asked the definition of the term "temperance" and when he can not sufficiently provide one, it sets up the main plot of the dialogue, the search for the meaning of the term. A wealthy orphan raised by his first cousin, Critias, his property was confiscated for his role in profaning the Eleusinian Mysteries in 415 BC. He is commonly listed as one of the Thirty Tyrants who ruled Athens following its defeat in the Peloponnesian War, but evidence points only to his having been one of the ten men appointed by the Thirty to govern the Piraeus. He was killed in the Battle of Munichia in 403 BC when the democrats returned to Athens.

This Charmides was probably not the same man as the father of the great Athenian sculptor Phidias, also named Charmides.

References

Thirty Tyrants
5th-century BC Athenians
403 BC deaths
Year of birth unknown
Ancient Greeks killed in battle
Family of Plato
Ancient LGBT people
LGBT history in Greece
Ancient LGBT history
Greek LGBT people